The  were a Japanese kin group in Shinano province during the Sengoku Period.

History
The Tomono claim descent from the Ogasawara clan, particularly Ogasawara Nagakiyo.

The clan were weakened after involvement in the Adachi Yasumori affair in 1285. In the Sengoku period they became vassals of Takeda Shingen, but later became retainers of the Tokugawa after the Takeda fell in 1582.

References

External links
  伴野氏 at Harimaya.com 
  "Tomono" at SamuraiArchives.com

Japanese clans
Sengoku period
Ogasawara clan